Shinkan Co., Ltd. (株式会社 神乾) is a Japanese company based in Kobe, Japan. Established in 1970, the company's line of business includes the wholesale distribution of groceries and related products. Shinkan is a member of JETRO.

Products 

 A variety of authentic Japanese dry, chilled and frozen foods (including JFDA brand products)
 Agricultural products (Shiitake mushroom, black fungus, dried radish, etc.)

External links 

 Official website
 YouTube Channel

References 

Companies based in Kobe
Companies of Japan